The Cabinet Secretariat is a part of the Cabinet of Pakistan, led by the Prime Minister Shehbaz Sharif. The administrative head is the Cabinet Secretary of Pakistan. The Secretariat has the following government departments attached under it: 

 Akthar Hameed Khan National Centre for Rural Development 
 Department of Communications Security 
 Department of Stationery and Forms 
 Federal Employees Benevolent and Group Insurance Fund 
 Federal Public Service Commission
 Civil Services Academy
 National School of Public Policy
 Pakistan Academy for Rural Development 
 Pakistan Bait-ul-Mal
 Pakistan International Airlines Corporation
 Pakistan Meteorological Department
 National Agromet Centre 
 Pakistan Tourism Development Corporation
 Printing Corporation of Pakistan
 Public Procurement Regulatory Authority
 Secretariat Training Institute 
 Staff Welfare Organization

References

Federal government ministries of Pakistan